Becquerelia is a genus of flowering plants belonging to the family Cyperaceae.

Its native range is Tropical America.

Species:

Becquerelia clarkei 
Becquerelia cymosa 
Becquerelia discolor 
Becquerelia merkeliana 
Becquerelia muricata 
Becquerelia tuberculata

References

Cyperaceae
Cyperaceae genera
Taxa named by Adolphe-Théodore Brongniart